Jack Bauerle (born February 7, 1952) is the former head coach of the University of Georgia (UGA) men's and women's swimming teams. At the end of his coaching career, Bauerle finished his 42nd year as a head coach for the UGA women's team and his 35th year as men's head coach. Bauerle began coaching the women's team in 1979 and later became head coach for the men's team as well in 1983. He has three children John, Magill and Duke who have followed in Jack's footsteps.

Swim career
Bauerle began swimming in the Philadelphia area at the Germantown YMCA, the Manor Lu Swim Club, and the Philadelphia Aquatic Club. As a senior in 1970, he was a co-captain of the La Salle College High School team and also swam on four teams that won the Philadelphia Catholic League Championships. In 2010 Bauerle was inducted into the La Salle College High School Alumni Hall of Fame.

As a varsity swimmer at UGA from 1971-72 to 1974-75, Bauerle swam for head coach Pete Scholle and set UGA  records in the 200-yard butterfly, 1,000- and 1,650-yard freestyle events, and served as the team captain of the 1973–74 and 1974–75 squads.

Career accomplishments

2020 Summer Olympics

Bauerle was one of the coaches for the 2020 US Olympic Swim Team leading up to and at the 2020 Summer Olympics in Tokyo, Japan, which were held in 2021 due to the COVID-19 pandemic. The Georgia Bulldogs contingent consisting of seven swimmers, Javier Acevedo, Hali Flickinger, Natalie Hinds, Chase Kalisz, Jay Litherland, Allison Schmitt, and Olivia Smoliga, representing two different countries, United States and Canada, for which Bauerle served as the head coach, was the largest group of NCAA swimmers from a single college or university in the United States to compete at the 2020 Olympic Games. His swimmers, that is, past and present swimmers he coached as Bulldogs, won five Olympic medals in just one day of competition, including Chase Kalisz who won not only the first Olympic medal in swimming, a gold medal, but the first Olympic medal in any sport at the 2020 Olympic Games for the United States. Bauerle's achievements as a coach and the accomplishments of his swimmers at the year's Olympic Games earned him a nomination from the USA Swimming Foundation for their 2021 Golden Goggle Award for "Coach of the Year".

Before 2021
As of the end of the 2013-2014 season Bauerle's teams have won six NCAA Women's national championships, eleven SEC Women's championships, and have finished second nationally seven times and in the top five 22 times. As of the end of the 2012-2013 season, he has coached 152 All-American women swimmers (including 690 First-Team and 375 Honorable Mention certificates), 92 All-American men swimmers (including 126 First-Team and 387 Honorable Mention certificates), and three Olympic gold medalists. In 2000 he was an Olympic swim coach; in 2003 and 2005, he was head coach for the Women's USA World Championship Team. Bauerle has been named NCAA coach of the year five times and SEC coach of the year 12 times. He earned a Bachelor of Arts in English from the University of Georgia in 1975.

On September 8, 2006, USA Swimming announced that Bauerle would be the head coach of the United States women's swimming team at the 2008 Summer Olympics.
“Jack Bauerle is the consummate team coach. What he has done at the University of Georgia represents the pinnacle of team swimming, which is what the U.S. Olympic Team is all about. He brings a fun approach to the sport, and that will be key to producing Olympic success for our women's team.”

USA Swimming's Mark Schubert used those words when he announced that Bauerle had been chosen as the head coach of the United States’ women's swimming team for the 2008 Olympics in Beijing, China. For Bauerle, who has done it all at the collegiate level, the Olympic appointment became the crowning moment of his career.

Bauerle worked tirelessly on behalf of Team USA for months, and the hard work paid off in Beijing. Under Bauerle's watch, the United States women earned a total of 14 medals (two golds, seven silvers, five bronze), the most of any nation. Two of his pupils, ex-Lady Bulldog Kara Lynn Joyce and 2008-09 freshman Allison Schmitt, were included in the medals haul as Joyce won two silvers and Schmitt secured a bronze. Bauerle's handiwork was on display as 12 athletes and coaches from his Georgia program joined him in Beijing.

Now it's back to work for Bauerle with his Georgia squads. He will pilot the women for the 30th year and the men for the 26th. He ended last season as a member of the prestigious 400-wins club with 242 victories with the Lady Bulldogs and 173 with the Bulldogs. Bauerle ranks third all-time on the wins list behind North Carolina's Frank Comfort (578) and Yale's Bob Kiphuth (528), and he is the winningest active coach.

Bauerle has met with unparalleled success in and out of the pool, highlighted by four team national championships with the Lady Bulldogs. Under Bauerle's watch, individual national and Southeastern Conference champions, All-Americans, record-setters, Academic All-Americans and NCAA Postgraduate Scholarship recipients have become the norm.

In 2007-08, Bauerle led both Georgia teams to a seventh-place finish at the NCAA Championship. On the men's side, Sebastien Rouault earned two more national championships, giving him three for his career, and finished with a school-record nine SEC titles. Gil Stovall and Chris Colwill also claimed individual NCAA titles for the Bulldogs. For the women, the Lady Bulldogs earned the No. 1 ranking in the final College Swim Coaches Association dual-meet poll and they ran their win streak at Gabrielsen Natatorium to 62.

The tradition established by the founders of the Georgia swimming and diving program have been steadfastly maintained in the Bauerle era. Not only do Bauerle and his coaching staff demand the best of their student-athletes – in the classroom, in the pool and in the community – but their efforts draw individuals who demand the best of themselves.

A look into Bauerle's character reveals the guiding force behind his motivation – a dedication to both the University and its swimming and diving program. Across the nation, a rare few have accumulated 300-plus wins. Among those only a few have claimed that honor while guiding only one program, a minority that includes Bauerle.

In nearly four decades overseeing Georgia's program, Bauerle has produced four team national championships and six Southeastern Conference crowns with the Lady Bulldogs. He has been chosen as the SEC Coach of the Year 13 times (11 with the women, two with the men) and the National Women's Coach of the Year five times.

During the 1998-99 season, Bauerle became the SEC's winningest coach, surpassing the 252 recorded by Tennessee's Ray Bussard from 1968-88. Bauerle then reached the elite 300 dual-meet-wins club in 2002.

That same commitment to excellence extends into the classroom, as Georgia athletes have always ranked among the nation's best in academic honors. In 2008, Georgia placed 17 swimmers and divers on the CSCAA Academic All-America Team and 30 on the SEC Academic Honor Roll. Karen Guilkey earned NCAA and SEC postgraduate scholarships, and she and Joseph Kapurch were presented senior student-athlete awards by the UGA Athletic Association.

Georgia swimming and diving can claim an achievement that only one other collegiate sports program (Arizona swimming and diving) can – three NCAA Woman of the Year Award winners in Lisa Coole (1997), Kristy Kowal (2000) and Kim Black (2001).

Conference results further evidence Bauerle's success. On the women's side, Georgia has secured top-three finishes at the SEC Championship in 19 of the last 22 years under Bauerle. In dual meet competition, the Lady Bulldogs have accumulated a 242-30-1 mark and have not lost a dual- or tri-meet competition in Gabrielsen Natatorium since the 1995-96 season, a streak of 62 entering the season.

Initially arriving in Athens in 1970, Bauerle himself was once a Bulldog freshman. Over the span of the next four years, Bauerle collected four letters, three school records and team co-captain honors as a junior and senior. However, Bauerle also learned how collegiate swimming extends outside the pool.
After spending seven years as a Bulldog swimmer and men's assistant coach, Bauerle first assumed women's head coaching duties in 1979. In their first two years under Bauerle, the Lady Bulldogs compiled a 16-3 record and a fifth-place finish at the inaugural women's SEC Championship.

In 1982, Georgia's women not only notched their third consecutive seven-plus-wins season, but they also traveled to their first national meet, a trip that landed the Lady Bulldogs a ninth-place finish and the first of 25 consecutive national meet appearances.

One of the earliest strides for the Lady Bulldogs came in 1986. Led by eight-time All-American Kathy Coffin, Bauerle's squad finished second at the SECs and won two conference events. Late that season, four swimmers earned All-America accolades as the Lady Bulldogs claimed a sixth-place showing at the NCAAs.
Bauerle's strides with the newly formed Lady Bulldogs of the 1980s reflect the charisma and strength of his coaching ability. It was therefore only a matter of time before this ability took effect on the men's program. After accepting the head coaching position in 1983, Bauerle quietly built up his men's team to the point that in 1988, Georgia earned its first NCAAs trip in 32 years, finishing 41st overall.

Answering the call of a Georgia team that had scored at NCAAs only once before was a good first step, and the Bulldogs responded with three more finishes in the top 32 from 1989-92. The Bulldogs climbed even higher the next three years with two 16th-place finishes and a 15th-place result from 1993-95. In 1996, the Bulldogs took 11th overall at the NCAAs, the first of eight straight top-15 finishes. Attaining their highest finish in school history, the 1997 Bulldogs shocked the
NCAA field with a third-place result.

Perhaps the greatest accomplishments of Bauerle's coaching career were reached during the 1997 season. Not only did the Lady Bulldogs earn their first league title, but combining the women's fifth-place finish with the third-place mark of the men at the NCAAs, Bauerle stood as the only coach during that season to lead two teams to top-five efforts. His contributions were recognized by the league as Bauerle was named SEC Men's Coach of the Year and SEC Women's Coach of the Year.

Bauerle experienced yet another banner year in 1998. The Lady Bulldogs repeated as SEC champions while the Bulldogs finished a strong second, and Bauerle collected the SEC Women's Swimming Coach of the Year honor. Both squads surfaced with unblemished dual-meet seasons for the first time in program history. Bauerle's season was capped at the NCAAs with the Lady Bulldogs placing third and he earned recognition as the CSCAA Women's Swimming Coach of the Year. Bauerle also received the 1998 National Collegiate and Scholastic Swim Trophy, presented annually by the CSCAA. That year, the Bulldogs were seventh at the NCAAs.

The 1999 season brought the breakthrough Bauerle had worked years to accomplish, as the Lady Bulldogs captured the NCAA team title in front of a boisterous hometown crowd. Behind the force of a true team effort, the Lady Bulldogs garnered 24 All-America finishes, eight Honorable Mention distinctions and four individual titles. The Bulldogs added a ninth-place showing at the NCAAs.

The 2000 women's squad repeated as national champions by winning nine NCAA events. Then the 2001 team won the NCAA crown by a mere 1.5 points ahead of Stanford in the closest meet in the history of the championships. The squad used depth to win the crown as the Lady Bulldogs’ 800 freestyle relay team was the only event winner.

The Lady Bulldogs’ streak of three national titles ended in 2002, but Bauerle's team still put on a show, finishing second. Some 10 American records were surpassed at the 2002 NCAAs, including four by the Lady Bulldogs.

In 2003, the Lady Bulldogs recorded a second-straight NCAA runner-up finish. In 2004, Georgia won six national titles en route to the program's third consecutive runner-up finish.

The Lady Bulldogs were back on top of the awards stand as they won the 2005 NCAAs. Georgia swept the relays, the first team in NCAA history to accomplish that feat.

In 2006, the NCAAs went down to the wire, with Auburn edging the Lady Bulldogs for the national title. Even so, Georgia recorded eight individual national champs and claimed the SEC title. On the men's side, Georgia entered the NCAAs with four all-time national champs and exited with three more – Colwill on the both springboards and Rouault in the 1,650 freestyle. The Bulldogs placed ninth at the NCAAs, their best showing since 1999, and finished third at the SECs for the fifth straight year.

The 2007 campaign was more of the same for Georgia. Bauerle led the Lady Bulldogs to the SEC title and to a national runner-up finish (their eighth top-2 showing in as many years) and the Bulldogs to a ninth-place finish nationally. Georgia produced another 11 individual national championships, led by Joyce, Mary DeScenza and Colwill. For his efforts, Bauerle was chosen as both the National Women's Coach of the Year and the SEC Women's Coach of the Year. Moreover, the program boasted two athletes chosen by different outlets as the National Swimmer of the Year (Joyce and DeScenza), the National and SEC Diver of the Year (Colwill), co-winners of the SEC Swimmer of the Year honor (Joyce and DeScenza) and the SEC Freshman of the Year (Cole).

The 2007 season was highlighted by Joyce's selection as the Honda Award winner for swimming as the nation's top performer and the SEC Swimmer of the Year. Under Bauerle's guidance, Joyce ended her career with 18 national titles (nine individuals, nine relays), which is the second-most in NCAA history. Bauerle guided the Lady Bulldogs to a fifth-place finish at the NCAAs. With SEC Swimmer of the Year Rouault leading the way, Bauerle's Bulldogs claimed the 13th spot at the NCAAs.

When he guided the U.S. women in 2008, it was Bauerle's second Olympic appointment. He also served as a swim assistant coach for the 2000 women's team. Additionally, Bauerle served as a personal swim coach at the Athens Olympics in 2004 where four Georgia swimmers brought home medals.
Bauerle has been around the world as a U.S. National Team coach at multiple international and national championships, including guiding the women at the 2005 World Championships in Canada. He also served as an assistant coach for the U.S. team at the 2001 and 2003 World Championships in Japan and Spain respectively. In 1997, Bauerle traveled to Italy, as the women's head coach for the USA World University Games Team. In 1995, Bauerle was in Atlanta as a women's assistant coach for the Pan Pacific Championships.

Besides coaching, Bauerle has dedicated his athletic talents to other endeavors, ranging from marathons to a world record for the most consecutive hours of doubles tennis. In 1983, Bauerle and three partners played 125 hours of tennis at the Jennings Mill Country Club to raise more than $50,000 for the American Cancer Society. For his contributions to the University and the community, Bauerle was selected to be an honorary member of the Sphinx Club, Blue Key Society, the Gridiron Society and Phi Kappa Phi. He is the Northeast Georgia Chairman for the United Way, which raised $2.1 million. He also was the Honorary Chairman for the World of Wonder project that raised more than $500,000 for construction of playgrounds. Last year, he received the Billy Hudson Distinguished Citizen Award from the Northeast Georgia Council of the Boy Scouts of America for his community service efforts.

Awards and honors
 Golden Goggle Award nominee, Coach of the Year:  2021

See also

 Georgia Bulldogs
 List of University of Georgia people
 List of Swimmers
 Swimming

Notes

References
Baurle's bio from the University of Georgia Athletics website.
Bauerle, Reese named 2008 head Olympic coaches. USA Swimming Press Release, 09-08-2006]

1952 births
Living people
American Olympic coaches
American swimming coaches
Georgia Bulldogs men's swimmers
Georgia Bulldogs swimming coaches
Swimmers from Philadelphia